Jena is a female given name of Arabic origin, meaning small bird.

Famous people
Jena Friedman (born 1983), American comedian
Jena Lee (born Sylvia Garcia, 1987, in Chile), French singer
Jena Malone (born 1984), American actress 
Jena Osman, American poet and editor
Jena Sims (born 1988), American beauty queen 
Jena Irene

Fictional characters
Jena Makharov in comic series Nikolai Dante
Jena Pyre, host of the Phoenix Force in Marvel Comics

See also 

 Jena (disambiguation)
 Jenna
 Jenny (given name)
 Jen

References

Arabic feminine given names